Punniyavayal  is a village in the  
Avadaiyarkoilrevenue block of Pudukkottai district, Tamil Nadu, India.

Demographics 

As per the 2001 census, Punniyavayal had a total population of 1749 with 858 males and 891 females. Out of the total population 976 people were literate.

References

Villages in Pudukkottai district